Dibbs is a surname. Notable people with the surname include:

Charlie Dibbs (1905–1960), Australian rules footballer
Crustified Dibbs, better known by his stage name R.A. the Rugged Man, is an American rapper
Eddie Dibbs (born 1951), retired American tennis player also nicknamed "Fast Eddie"
George Dibbs KCMG (1834–1904), Australian politician who was Premier of New South Wales on three occasions
John Dibbs, master mariner during 1822–1835 around the colony of New South Wales, New Zealand and the Society Islands
Mr. Dibbs (born Brad Forste), American DJ and hip hop producer
Thomas Allwright Dibbs (1833–1923), Australian banker

See also
Dibbs ministry (disambiguation) may refer to one of the three ministries of George Dibbs, Premier of New South Wales
Dibbs ministry (1885)
Dibbs ministry (1889)
Dibbs ministry (1891–94)
Dibb (disambiguation)
Dibs (disambiguation)
McDibbs

fr:Dibbs